The CHL Sportsman of the Year Award is given out annually to the most sportsmanlike player in the Canadian Hockey League. It is chosen from the winner of the William Hanley Trophy of the Ontario Hockey League, the Frank J. Selke Memorial Trophy of the Quebec Major Junior Hockey League, or the Brad Hornung Trophy of the Western Hockey League.

Winners
List of winners of the CHL Sportsman of the Year Award.

See also
 List of Canadian Hockey League awards

References

External links
 CHL Awards – CHL

Canadian Hockey League trophies and awards
Sportsmanship trophies and awards